Orbivestus catumbensis is a plant in the family Asteraceae, native to Angola and Zambia.

Description
The capitula each have about 18 purple or mauve-white flowers. The fruits are achenes.

References

Vernonieae
Flora of Angola
Flora of Zambia
Plants described in 1898